Hegewald was a short-lived German colony during World War II, situated near Zhytomyr in Reichskommissariat Ukraine. It was repopulated in late 1942 and early 1943 by Volksdeutsche settlers transferred from occupied territories of Poland, Croatia, Bessarabia, and the Soviet Union to an area earmarked for the projected Germanization of the Ukrainian lands. Plans were prepared months in advance by the SS, RKFDV and VoMi, but major problems with supplies occurred right from the region's initial establishment. Himmler's original plans to recruit settlers from Scandinavia and the Netherlands were unsuccessful.

History
The initial plans were difficult to implement for a number of reasons, including the reluctance and fear among many Volksdeutsche owing to partisan activities in the area. Elaborate guidelines were set up to prepare the locations. The new settlers were to receive the homes of killed or evicted Ukrainian peasants, as well as their furniture, livestock, and food, and schools were to be built. This required a massive deportation effort, mostly on foot. Most homes were in terrible shape by German standards. There was a considerable shortage of lumber, and general lack of winter clothing and shoes.

The Ukrainian and Polish Germans arrived by train, having been forcibly removed from their homes, to be doled out plots of land and informed of their quotas. They received use, but not ownership, of the land assigned to them.

Neither the deported Ukrainians nor the ethnic Germans received more than a few hours' notice of their relocation. Despite damage to the houses, most could be made functional before snowfall. Elaborate Christmas pageants were set up, deliberately irreligious, to celebrate the return of light and link it to the "dark powers" surrounding Germany, and gifts and food were provided.

All did not go as planned. The intended preparations were undermined by filching of craftsmen, and neither food nor clothing arrived as promised. Furthermore, many evicted Ukrainians returned to the area. Efforts were made to continue, with League of German Girls members being sent even when they had to receive gas masks and soldier escorts, but by November 1943, the inhabitants were in flight before the Red Army. These were the first of massive flights from Eastern Europe.

Villages
The colony consisted of 27 villages, all renamed in German; they were situated along the Zhytomyr-Berdychiv road. The villages reverted to their Ukrainian names after the war.

See also
 Wehrbauer

Notes

References
 

The Holocaust in Ukraine
Cultural assimilation
Poland in World War II
Heinrich Himmler